Rum Aladdin was created in 2002 as a merger of Rum Metal Manufacturing Company and Rum-Aladdin Industries.  Rum Aladdin is based in Jordan and is headquartered in Amman.

The company's stock is represented on the Amman Stock Exchange's ASE Weighted Index.

Operations
The company is composed of two merged manufacturing companies:

Rum Metal
Rum Metal was established in 1972.  It is a manufacturing company, producing tools and dies, performing sheet metal work, paint work and assembly work.

Rum Aladdin Industries
Rum Aladdin Industries was established in 1981.  It is involved with assembling gas heaters, TVss and electric heaters, water heaters, ladders, LCD.

External links
Rum Aladdin Industries' official website

Manufacturing companies of Jordan
Companies based in Amman
Manufacturing companies established in 2002
Jordanian companies established in 2002
2002 mergers and acquisitions
Jordanian brands
Companies listed on the Amman Stock Exchange